George James Howard, 9th Earl of Carlisle (12 August 184316 April 1911), known as George Howard until 1889, was an English aristocrat, peer, politician, and painter. He was the last Earl of Carlisle to own Castle Howard.

Early life
Howard was born in London, England on 12 August 1843. He was the only son of Hon. Charles Howard and the Hon. Mary Parke, who died fourteen days after his birth.

His father was the fifth son of George Howard, 6th Earl of Carlisle and his maternal grandfather was James Parke, 1st Baron Wensleydale. Among his father's family were uncles George Howard, 7th Earl of Carlisle and William George Howard, 8th Earl of Carlisle, who served as the Rector of Londesborough, both of whom died unmarried and without legitimate issue.

He was educated at Eton and Trinity College, Cambridge, where he joined the Cambridge Apostles in 1864. After graduating from Cambridge he studied at Heatherley School of Fine Art in London.

Career

Howard's art teachers were Alphonse Legros and Giovanni Costa, and he belonged to the 'Etruscan School' of painters. He married Rosalind Frances Stanley in 1864, but did not share her campaigning interests, although he supported temperance. He was a friend of, and a patron to, a number of the artists of the Pre-Raphaelite Brotherhood, being particularly close to Edward Burne-Jones.

The Howards lived in London in Kensington, in a house at 1 Palace Green, built for them by Arts and Crafts architect Philip Webb in 1870, and at Naworth Castle. Among their visitors at Naworth were Robert Browning, William Ewart Gladstone, Lewis Carroll, Alfred, Lord Tennyson and many others. William Morris was an intimate friend, and his wallpapers were used in Kensington, at Naworth Castle and at Castle Howard when George inherited it. 
With Morris and Webb he was one of the founding members of the Society for the Protection of Ancient Buildings.

Collections

Lord Carlisle's work can be found in a number of public and private collections, including the Tate, York Art Gallery, the Government Art Collection, the National Portrait Gallery, the Ashmolean Museum, the Delaware Art Museum, the Castle Howard Collection and the British Library. An additional Burne-Jones cartoon is in the private collection of Tomkinsons Stained Glass Ltd.

Political career
Howard was Liberal Party Member of Parliament for East Cumberland between 1879 and 1880 and again between 1881 and 1885. He succeeded in the earldom in 1889 on the death of his uncle The 8th Earl of Carlisle. He was a trustee of the National Gallery.

Personal life

On 4 October 1864, Lord Carlisle married The Honourable Rosalind Frances Stanley, daughter of Edward Stanley, 2nd Baron Stanley of Alderley and the Hon. Henrietta Maria Dillon (eldest daughter of Henry Dillon, 13th Viscount Dillon). Together, George and Rosalind were the parents of eleven children:

 Lady Mary Henrietta Howard (1865–1956), who married George Gilbert Aimé Murray, son of Sir Terence Aubrey Murray, in 1889.
 Charles James Stanley Howard, 10th Earl of Carlisle (1867–1912), who married Rhoda Ankaret L'Estrange, eldest daughter of Col. Paget Walter L'Estrange.
 Lady Cecilia Maude Howard (1868-1947), who married Charles Henry Roberts, the Under-Secretary of State for India, in 1891.
 Hon. Hubert George Lyulph Howard (1871–1898), who was killed at the Battle of Omdurman.
 Hon. Christopher Edward Howard (1873–1896).
 Hon. Oliver Howard (1875–1908), who married Muriel Stephenson (1876–1952) in 1900. After his death, his widow married Arthur Meade, 5th Earl of Clanwilliam.
 Hon. Geoffrey William Algernon Howard (1877–1935), who married Hon. Ethel Christian Methuen, eldest daughter of Paul Methuen, 3rd Baron Methuen.
 Hon. Michael Francis Stafford Howard (1880–1917), who married Nora Hensman in 1911.
 Lady Dorothy Howard (d. 1968), who married Francis Robert Eden, 6th Baron Henley (1877–1962) in 1913.
 Lady Elizabeth Dacre Howard (1883–1883).
 Lady Aurea Howard (b. 1884), who married Denyss Chamberlaine Wace in 1923. She later married Major Thomas MacLeod OBE in 1928.

Lord Carlisle died at Brackland, Hindhead, Surrey, in April 1911, aged 67. His eldest son Charles succeeded in the earldom. The Countess of Carlisle died on 12 August 1921, aged 76, at her home in Kensington Palace Gardens. Their ashes are interred at Lanercost Priory.

Descendants
Through his daughter Lady Dorothy, Carlisle was a grandfather of Michael Francis Eden, 7th Baron Henley (born 1914), Barbara Dorothy Eden, Griselda Rosalind Eden (born 1917), Nancy Clare Eden (born 1918), and Roger Quentin Eden (born 1922).

His daughter Cecilia was the mother of Wilfrid Roberts (1900–1991), who had four daughters.

Ancestry

References

 Virginia Surtees (1988) The Artist and the Autocrat. George and Rosalind Howard, Earl and Countess of Carlisle
 Robin Gibson, George Howard and His Circle at Carlisle, The Burlington Magazine, Vol. 110, No. 789, Special Issue Commemorating the Bicentenary of The Royal Academy (1768–1968) (Dec., 1968), p. 720

External links 
 
 
 Victorian Web page
 ArtCyclopedia page
 St Martin's Pre-Raphaelite Church, Brampton, Cumbria at www.stmartinsbrampton.org.uk
 National Portrait Gallery; his portrait of his wife Rosalind
 National Portrait Gallery: his portrait of Edward Burne-Jones
 National Portrait Gallery: his portrait of James Parke, 1st Baron Wensleydale, maternal grandfather
 Tate Collection | View from the Front of St John Lateran, Rome at www.tate.org.uk, Balliol College portraits of Benjamin Jowett and Mazzini, online pictures.

1843 births
1911 deaths
George Howard, 9th Earl of Carlisle
19th-century English painters
English male painters
20th-century English painters
09
People educated at Eton College
Alumni of Trinity College, Cambridge
Howard, George
Howard, George
Howard, George
Carlisle, E9